2,6-Dibromoquinonechlorimide is a chemical used in chemical analysis and chromatography to detect phenolic chemicals. In the presence of phenolic substances it turns indigo in colour. In the presence of aflatoxin it turns green. 2,6-Dibromoquinonechlorimide explodes if heated above 120 °C and decomposes slowly over 60 °C.

2,6-Dibromoquinonechlorimide is used in a buffer solution around pH 9.4. It is very sensitive and can detect down to 0.05 parts per million of phenols. The mechanism is a reaction of the chlorimide group (=NCl) with the phenol to produce an indophenol, with two rings joined via an =N- link.

References

Chlorimides
Quinones
Organobromides